Xinjiang Subdistrict is a subdistrict in Dongxing District, Neijiang, Sichuan province, China. , it has 10 residential communities under its administration.

See also 
 List of township-level divisions of Sichuan

References 

Township-level divisions of Sichuan
Neijiang